Zia is a Papuan language spoken in the Lower Waria Valley in Morobe Province, Papua New Guinea.  It is part of the Binandere subgroup of the Trans–New Guinea phylum of languages (Ross, 2005).

Orthography

References

External links 
 
 
 Zia Swadesh List

Languages of Morobe Province
Greater Binanderean languages